The Men's pursuit competition at the 2017 World Championships was held on 12 February 2017.

Results
The race was started at 15:00.

References

Men's pursuit